Jerzy Jan Lerski (nom de guerre: Jur; also known as George Jan Lerski; 1917-1992); was a Polish lawyer, soldier, historian, political scientist and politician. After World War II he emigrated to the United States, where he became a full professor at the University of San Francisco.

Life
Born 20 January 1917 in Lwów, Poland (now Lviv, Ukraine), Lerski studied law at Lwów University. In interwar Poland he joined the Stronnictwo Demokratyczne (Polish Democratic Party); he became known for his strong opposition to anti-semitic events.

Jerzy Lerski first saw action in World War II during the 1939 Polish September Campaign. He fought in the Battle of Brześć Litewski in the rank of officer cadet (podchorąży, ensign). Taken prisoner by the Soviet Army during the Soviet invasion, he managed to escape from a train transport. He joined the anti-Soviet resistance but, with the NKVD (the Soviet Secret Police) actively looking for him, he escaped via Hungary to France, joining the Polish Armed Forces in the West. After the fall of France on 25 June 1940, Lerski went to Great Britain. In 1941, after taking a commando course, he became a "cichociemny" (a member of a secret unit of the Polish Army in exile). Parachuting into occupied Poland in February 1943, he served as one of the couriers for the Polish Government in Exile – individuals who risked their lives, moving between the Polish Government in Exile, in London, England, and the Polish Secret State in occupied Poland. After collecting information from the Secret State, he returned to London.

In November 1944 he was appointed secretary to the third Prime Minister of Poland in Exile, Tomasz Arciszewski (1877–1955). At a meeting between Arciszewski and the Prime Minister of the United Kingdom, Winston Churchill, Lerski gave a detailed report on the plight of the Jews in Poland. After 8 May 1945, when World War II ended in Europe, Lerski decided to remain in London instead of returning to Soviet-dominated communist Poland. He was active in the Polish political movement, Polski Ruch Wolnościowy Niepodległość i Demokracja. In July 1947 he resigned as Arciszewski's secretary.

On the eve of the Cold War, Lerski moved from the United Kingdom to the United States. He obtained his Ph.D. in history from Georgetown University in 1953 and taught at several US universities before in 1956 joining the faculty at the University of San Francisco, where he became a professor and historian of East Central Europe.  His courses at USF were on Modern European History. Politically a conservative Republican, he feared the armed power of the Soviet Union against the unprepared West. He was also a visiting scholar abroad, lecturing in Pakistan, Sri Lanka, and Japan. He retired from the University of San Francisco in 1982, but continued to lecture at the Fromm Institute for Lifelong Learning at the University of San Francisco.

Lerski published books and articles on Polish history. In 1988 he published memoirs about his wartime experiences, Poland's Secret Envoy, 1939–1945. He was a personal friend of Karol Józef Wojtyła, later Pope John Paul II. He supported Solidarność (Solidarity) founder and activist Lech Wałęsa.

The State of Israel recognized him as a Righteous Among the Nations, an honor given to non-Jews who risked their lives during the Holocaust to save Jews from extermination by the Nazis. The citation read, "Jerzy Jan Lerski ... informed political circles abroad about the extermination and persecution of Jews."

George Lerski died following coronary bypass surgery on 16 September 1992 at the Veterans Hospital in San Francisco, California.

Works

 Jerzy Lerski The Economy of Poland Washington 1954, Council for Economic and Industry Research;
 Jerzy Lerski A Polish Chapter in Jacksonian America:The United States and the Polish Exiles of 1831 ; Madison, University of Wisconsin Press, 1958
 Jerzy Lerski Origins of Trotskyism in Ceylon ; a documentary history of the Lanka Sama Samaja Party, 1935-1942. Stanford 1968, Hoover Institution on War, Revolution and Peace,
 Jerzy Lerski Herbert Hoover and Poland : a documentary history of a friendship / compiled and with an introd. by George J. Lerski ; foreword by U. S. Senator Mark O. Hatfield (R-OR). Stanford 1977: Hoover Institution Press,  
 Jerzy Lerski Jewish-Polish coexistence, 1772-1939 : a topical bibliography / compiled by George J. Lerski and Halina T. Lerski ; foreword by Lucjan Dobroszycki. New York 1986, Greenwood Press, 
 Jerzy Lerski Poland's Secret Envoy, 1939–1945 (autobiography), New York 1988, Bicentennial Publishing, ISBN 0912757213
 Jerzy Lerski Emisariusz Jur (autobiography), Warszawa 1989, wyd. I krajowe, wyd OW "Interim" , 
 Jerzy Lerski Historical dictionary of Poland, 966-1945 / George J. Lerski ; with special editing and emendations by Piotr Wróbel and Richard J. Kozicki ; foreword by Aleksander Gieysztor.  Westport 1996, Greenwood Press,

See also
List of Poles

External links
Short biography based on biographical note in Historical Dictionary of Poland, 966-1945)

References

1917 births
1992 deaths
Military personnel from Lviv
Home Army members
Polish emigrants to the United States
University of San Francisco faculty
Polish military personnel of World War II
Polish prisoners of war
World War II prisoners of war held by the Soviet Union
20th-century Polish historians
Polish male non-fiction writers
Polish politicians
Officers of the Order of Polonia Restituta
Polish Righteous Among the Nations
Historians of Polish Americans
American male non-fiction writers
20th-century American male writers